Overhoff Technology Corp is a subsidiary of US Nuclear Corp, (OTC BB: UCLE) based in Milford, Ohio that designs, constructs, and sells radiation monitoring equipment.

History
Overhoff Technology Corp was founded by Mario Overhoff (1928-2005). The company was acquired by Optron Scientific Corp/Technical Associates in 2006 and operates under US Nuclear Corp.

In 2010, Overhoff partnered with Locus Technologies to provide a Tritium monitoring solution for the nuclear industry, in order to address concerns regarding leaking and possibly dangerous levels of Tritium.
The company became publicly traded in early 2015 and trades on the Over-the-Counter Bulletin Board under the trading symbol: UCLE.

Products
Their product line includes tritium monitors, heavy water leak detectors, gamma survey meters, environmental ion chambers and neutron dosimeters which are used to detect radioactive tritium in air, water and ground sources.

Overhoff Technology's products are ISO 9001 certified and used globally for nuclear power plants, fusion energy research, development of new pharmaceuticals, defense industries, and research facilities. The company has been awarded contracts by the United States Department of Defense and sells tritium equipment to China, South Korean, Canada, UK and Argentina based nuclear power facilities.

References

External links
 US Nuclear Corp cleared by FINRA to trade under ticker symbol UCLE 
 US Nuclear Corp website 

 Obituary for Dr. Overhoff
 In Memoriam from Health Physics Society http://hps.org/aboutthesociety/people/inmemoriam/Overhoff.html
 
 Technical Associates (now part of US Nuclear Corp along with Overhoff Technology Corp)

Companies based in Ohio
Companies based in California
Nuclear technology companies of the United States
Nuclear industry